Juana Iris  is a Mexican telenovela produced by Carlos Téllez and Lucero Suárez for Televisa in 1985.

Victoria Ruffo and Valentín Trujillo starred as protagonists, while Blanca Guerra starred IN main antagonist. Carmen Montejo, Adriana Roel and Raymundo Capetillo co-starred.

Cast

Awards

References

External links

1985 telenovelas
Mexican telenovelas
Televisa telenovelas
1985 Mexican television series debuts
1985 Mexican television series endings
Spanish-language telenovelas
Television shows set in Mexico